Falcon 9 booster B1056 was a reusable Falcon 9 Block 5 first-stage booster manufactured by SpaceX. The booster was the fourth Falcon 9 to fly four times and broke a turnaround record for an orbital class booster on its fourth flight. The booster's service came to an end on its fourth flight following a landing failure on a Starlink flight.


Flight history 
First flight

B1056 entered service on May 4, 2019, lofting a Dragon to the International Space Station in support of CRS-17. The vehicle landed aboard the autonomous spaceport drone ship Of Course I Still Love You approximately eight and a half minutes after launch. Normally, first stages supporting CRS missions land at LZ-1, however a failed static fire of a Crew Dragon contaminated the landing pad. This forced B1056 to land just 28 km downrange on OCISLY.

Second flight

On July 25 2019, B1056 launched a second CRS mission, carrying a Dragon to the ISS in support of CRS-18. Following stage separation, B1056 landed at Landing Zone 1 at Cape Canaveral Air Force Station. This flight demonstrated the first time a Dragon spacecraft flew for a third time.

Third flight

B1056 made its third flight on December 16, 2019, carrying JCSAT-18/Kacific-1 to geostationary transfer orbit. About eight minutes after launch, B1056 landed on Of Course I Still Love You - completing its first GTO mission.

Fourth flight

B1056 became the fourth booster to re-fly a fourth time, also breaking a turnaround record, achieving just 63 days between its previous flight. The previous record was held by B1045 for nearly two years. Since then, B1060 and B1058 have both broken the world record previously held by Space Shuttle Atlantis, both with a 27 day turnaround time. 
The flight was expected to be the 50th successful landing  but ended up being the first time a flight-proven booster suffered a landing failure due to incorrect wind prediction. The booster was initially reported to be intact but was subsequently scuttled and did not return to port.

Launches

References 

Individual Falcon 9 boosters